Below is a list of countries and territories by  public debt (also called government debt or sovereign debt).  Gross government debt is government financial liabilities that are debt instruments.  A debt instrument is a financial claim that requires payment of interest and/or principal by the debtor to the creditor in the future.  Examples include debt securities (such as bonds and bills), loans, and government employee pension obligations.  Net debt equals gross debt minus financial assets that are debt instruments.  Net debt estimates are not always available since some government assets are difficult to value, such as loans made at concessional rates.

Changes in government debt over time reflect primarily borrowing due to past government deficits.  A deficit occurs when a government's expenditures exceed revenues.

In the list below, government debt is measured for the general government sector because the level of government responsible for programs (for example, health care) differs across countries, and the general government comprises central, state, provincial, regional, and local governments, and social security funds.  

To make the numbers comparable across countries of different size, government debt is measured as a percentage of a country's gross domestic product (GDP).  For context on the magnitude of the debt numbers, European Union member countries have an agreement, the Stability and Growth Pact (SGP), to maintain a general government gross debt of no more than 60% of GDP.  The aim of the SGP is to prevent excessive debt burdens.

Government debt as a percentage of GDP in 2021
Source: International Monetary Fund: World Economic Outlook Database.

When data for 2021 is not available, numbers are IMF staff estimates.

Public debt per capita 

The figures here are represented per capita.

* indicates a link to the article "Public debt of country/territory" or "Economy of country/territory."

See also

List of countries by future gross government debt
List of countries by tax revenue to GDP ratio
List of countries by credit rating
List of countries by corporate debt
List of countries by household debt
List of countries by external debt
World debt

Nation specific
United States public debt
Japan public debt
United Kingdom national debt
Canadian public debt
South African national debt

References

Debt-to-GDP ratio
List
Lists of countries by population-related issue
public